Römerberg is a municipality in the Rhein-Pfalz-Kreis, in Rhineland-Palatinate, Germany.

History
The municipality of Römerberg was established by the fusion of the municipalities of Berghausen, Heiligenstein and Mechtersheim in 1969. The seat of the municipality is in the village Heiligenstein.

References

Rhein-Pfalz-Kreis